Martin Siebenbrunner (born April 5, 1968, in Bregenz) is an Austrian photographer and entrepreneur.

Biography 
Siebenbrunner finished his studies of industrial electronics at the Vienna University of Technology in 1993. One year earlier, beside his studies he founded SiTec – a software company, developing ticketing and reservation systems for cinemas and hotels.

The son of an Austrian family of photographers started 2006 to work as an independent photographer, focused on Glamour- and Fine-art photography. His first exhibition 'Nackt!' in the center of Vienna was widely recognized and helped him to an international breakthrough. Between 2011 and 2013 Martin Siebenbrunner was head of the picture desk of the German Penthouse magazine and signed responsible for a mayor part of covers and photo stories. He published his first Coffee table book 'Private Sessions' in 2014.

Beside a goldmedal from the largest European association of photography – Fédération Internationale de l'Art Photographique (FIAP), he was also awarded with a "Goldmedal of Excellence" at the Trirenberger Supercircuit.

Martin Siebenbrunner is based in Vienna and Palma de Mallorca.

Work 
Martin Siebenbrunners's work is published in several international magazines like FHM, GQ, Penthouse (USA), Volo Magazine (USA) as well as in photo journals i.a. Photographie, Fotospiegel, Fine Art Foto, Photographie Artistique.

He was features in various TV-shows. He shot the finalists in Austria's Next Topmodel and was part of Penthouse model casting, which was documented in RTL2-Exklusiv die Reportage.

Exhibitions 
 2009: Exhibition: „Nackt!“, Vienna 
 2009: Exhibition: „Puppets and puppeteers“, Vienna 
 2010: Exhibition: „makel-los“, Vienna 
 2010: Exhibition: „Wir leben und arbeiten in Vienna“
 2011: Exhibition: „Heartbeat“, Vienna 
 2011: Exhibition: „Freunde von art-com“ 
 2011: Exhibition: „WEISS-SCHWARZ“, Vienna 
 2012: Exhibition: „SELECTED“, Stilwerk Vienna 
 2013: Exhibition: „Vienna Erotic II“, Vienna 
 2013: Exhibition: „Vienna Erotic & more“, Zürich 
 2014: Exhibition: „Private Sessions“, Vienna

Literature 
 Private Sessions, echomedia
 Private Sessions Calendar 2015
 BOOBMANIA, Edition Skylight

References 

 Private Sessions – echomedia
 Presentation of Private Sessions
 Exhibition WIESS-SCHWARZ
 Gallery Steiner
 EyesOn 2010
 Nackt!
 Penthouse USA
 Report about Siebenbrunner in Wann&Wo
 Fashion TV

External links 
 Official page of Martin Siebenbrunner
 YouTube Channel of Martin Siebenbrunner
 SiTec Computertechnik

Austrian photographers
Living people
1968 births